Lisbon Township may refer to:

 Lisbon Township, Kendall County, Illinois
 Lisbon Township, Yellow Medicine County, Minnesota
 Lisbon Township, Sampson County, North Carolina, in Sampson County, North Carolina
 Lisbon Township, Davison County, South Dakota, in Davison County, South Dakota

Township name disambiguation pages